Troedyrhiw F.C. were an association football team based in Merthyr Tydfil County Borough, where they played in the South Wales Amateur League First Division. They entered the FA Cup on six occasions in the late 1940s and early 1950s, losing at the first qualifying round stage each time. They played in the Welsh Football League finishing 14th in the 2009–10 Welsh Football League Division Three season. They then dropped to the South Wales Amateur League before folding in 2012.

Honours

South Wales Amateur Cup Winners: 1908–09
Welsh League Division Two Champions: 1920–21
Welsh League Division 2B Champions: 1925–26
Welsh League Division 2B Champions: 1926–27
Welsh League Division Two Champions: 1930–31
Welsh League Division Two Champions: 1931–32
Amateur Cup Winners: 1946–47
Welsh League Runner Up: 1947–48
Left Welsh League: 1965
Reformed in Merthyr League: 1993
Merthyr League Premier Champions: 1995–96
Joined Amateur League Division Two: 1996–97
Amateur League Division Two Champions/Int.cup Winners: 1997–98
Amateur League Division One Champions/Int.cup Runner Up: 2000–01
Joined Welsh League Division Three: 2001–02
Welsh League Division Three Champions: 2004–05

FA Cup results
Below is a list of all FA Cup matches played by Troedyrhiw during their only spell in the competition, from 1948 until 1953. In this period they won two Preliminary Round matches, but were knocked out of the competition at the 1st Qualifying Round stage in all six attempts.

References

 
Football clubs in Wales
Sport in Merthyr Tydfil County Borough
Welsh Football League clubs
2012 disestablishments in Wales
Defunct football clubs in Wales
Association football clubs disestablished in 2012
South Wales Amateur League clubs
Merthyr and District League clubs